Reko is a village on the southwestern coast of Savo Island, Central Province, Solomon Islands. The Ocean Express stops off at Reko between Honiara and Tulagi.

References

Populated places in Central Province (Solomon Islands)